The Frigidolfo (also called Oglio Frigidolfo) is a stream of Val Camonica, in the province of Brescia, about 7 km long.

It rises in the Valle delle Messi, near the Gavia Pass on the slopes of the Corno dei Tre Signori (3360 m a.s.l.).

Along its path it receives water from the Arcanello.

Its confluence with the Narcanello in Ponte di Legno (1300 m a.s.l.) gives rise to the Oglio River.

References

Rivers of the Province of Brescia